Don Preister (born December 23, 1946) is a Democrat who served 16 years as a Nebraska state senator from Bellevue, Nebraska in the Nebraska Legislature and greeting card manufacturer for Joy Creations.  He has served on the Bellevue City Council since 2009 and was the council president for 2013.  He founded Green Bellevue in 2009 and serves as its leader.

Personal life
He was born in Columbus, Nebraska and graduated from South High School in Omaha, Nebraska. He also graduated from University of Nebraska at Omaha in 1977. From 1966 to 1968 he was a U.S. Army medic who was awarded the Bronze Star and other medals during his service in Vietnam.  He is a former Boys' Clubs of Omaha, Unit Director,  community college instructor and current member of many South Omaha, Bellevue and veterans organizations.

State legislature
He was elected in 1992 to represent the 5th  Nebraska legislative district and re-elected in 1996, 2000, and 2004.  He served on the Agriculture, General Affairs, Natural Resources, Performance Audit, and Revenue committees and also served as Vice Chairman of the Executive Board, as well as the Committee on Committees .

See also
 Nebraska Legislature

References
 

1946 births
Living people
Democratic Party Nebraska state senators
People from Omaha, Nebraska
People from Columbus, Nebraska
People from Bellevue, Nebraska